The Tatra 600, named the Tatraplan, was a rear-engined large family car (D-segment in Europe) produced from 1948 to 1952 by the Czech manufacturer Tatra. The first prototype was finished in 1946.

History

After World War II, Tatra continued its pre-war business of building passenger cars in addition to commercial vehicles and military vehicles. The factory was nationalised in 1946 two years before the Communist takeover. Although production of pre-war models continued, a new model, the Tatra 600 Tatraplan was designed in 1946-47 by Josef Chalupa, Vladimír Popelář, František Kardaus and Hans Ledwinka. The name of the car celebrated the new Communist planned economy but also referred to aeroplane inspiration ('éroplan' means aeroplane in colloquial Czech).

After two prototypes "Ambrož" (December 1946) and "Josef" (March 1947), the 600 went into mass production in 1948. In 1951, the state planning department decided that the Tatraplan should henceforth be built at the Skoda Auto plant in Mladá Boleslav, leaving Tatra to concentrate on truck assembly. This was quite unpopular with the workforce at both plants: as a result Skoda built Tatraplans for one year only before the model was discontinued in 1952.

The Tatraplan had a monocoque streamlined ponton-styled 6-seat fastback saloon body with front suicide doors and a drag coefficient (Cd) of just 0.32.  It was powered by an air-cooled flat-4-cylinder 1,952 cc rear-mounted engine. 6,342 were made, 2,100 of them in Mladá Boleslav. In 2010, in the UK, the Tatraplan won the 'Classic Car of the Year' competition in the 1940s category.

Models

 Tatra 107 - predecessor of 600, produced from 1946–1947.
 Tatra 201 - commercial version of 600, four built (a pickup truck, a panel van, and two ambulances) in 1947. Unlike the 600, the 201 was front-engined.
 Tatra 600 Diesel - similar to 600 but with 2.0L diesel engine, three prototypes built in 1949.
 Tatra 601 Monte Carlo - a 2-door sports car based on the 600, one (possibly two) built in 1949.
 Tatra 602 Tatraplan Sports - a racing car based on the 600, 2 built in 1949.
 Tatra 604 - smaller version of 600, one prototype built in 1954.

Gallery

Notes
Streamlined Tatras
Tatra V570 1931, 1933
Tatra 77 1933-1938
Tatra 87 1936-1950
Tatra 97 1936-1939
Tatra 600 1946-1952
Tatra 603 1956-1975

References

Margolius, Ivan: 'Tatra T600 – Tatraplan', Architectural Design, vol. 71, no. 5, September 2001, London, pp. 84–88.
Field, Ben: 'Smooth Operator', Classic Cars magazine, May 2010, pp. 88–92
Margolius, Ivan and Henry, John G: Tatra - The Legacy of Hans Ledwinka, SAF Publishing, Harrow 1990, 
Margolius, Ivan and Henry, John G: Tatra - The Legacy of Hans Ledwinka, Veloce Publishing, Dorchester 2015,

External links 

600
Cars powered by boxer engines
1950s cars
Cars introduced in 1948
Rear-engined vehicles
Rear-wheel-drive vehicles
Mid-size cars
Sedans